Manchester Royal Infirmary (MRI) is a large NHS teaching hospital in Chorlton-on-Medlock, Manchester, England. Founded by Charles White in 1752 as part of the voluntary hospital movement of the 18th century, it is now a major regional and national medical centre. It is the largest Hospital within Manchester University NHS Foundation Trust, and based on its Oxford Road Campus in South Manchester where it shares a site with the Royal Manchester Children's Hospital, Manchester Royal Eye Hospital and Saint Mary's Hospital as well as several other educational and research facilities. The Hospital is also a key site for medical educational within Manchester, serving as a main teaching hospital for School of Medical Sciences, University of Manchester.

History

The first premises was a house in Garden Street, off Withy Grove, Manchester, which were opened on Monday 27 July 1752, financed by subscriptions. Government of the institution was in the hands of the trustees. Any subscriber who paid 2 guineas a year was a trustee. Those who donated 20 guineas became a trustee for life. The trustees appointed physicians and surgeons by voting. In 1835 900 trustees assembled to vote in the town hall. Joseph Jordan was elected, having secured 466 votes.

There were initially three physicians and three surgeons, Charles White being one. White co-founded the Infirmary with local industrialist Joseph Bancroft in 1752, and was an honorary surgeon there until 1790. One patient, John Boardman, who had Scrofula was treated. The first inpatient was admitted on 3 August, Benjamin Dooley, aged 12, had "sordid ulcers in the leg". In 1753 it was decided to purchase surgical instruments and to establish a dispensary.

New Infirmary

Opening of the new hospital 

It was decided to build a new hospital in 1753 on land leased from Sir Oswald Mosley, lord of the manor, who granted a 999-year lease at an annual rent of £6. The site had previously been called the Daub Holes: these pits, 615 feet long, had filled with water and they were replaced by a fine ornamental pond.

The new premises had space for eighty beds and were on Lever's Row in the area now known as Piccadilly Gardens (the gardens were only created after the demolition of the former MRI buildings in 1914). The new building was opened on 9 June 1755. It had three stories and cellars. The first student, John Daniel, was taken on as an apprentice to the apothecary. By 1756 it was already necessary to add a new wing to the north to house a laundry and wash house. In 1764 there were 85 inpatients. Patients sometimes shared a bed.

Manchester Lunatic Asylum 
The building of the Manchester Lunatic Asylum on the same site as the main hospital was completed in 1765. In 1849 it was removed to Cheadle, Cheshire.

Public baths 
In 1779 public baths were built on the site. Cold baths were 6d (2½p), a Buxton bath 1/- (5p), a warm bath 1/-, and a vapour bath or use of the seating room 5/- (25p). Prices were doubled on Sunday. It was also possible to pay an annual fee. The baths were very popular and profitable. William and Ann Howarth were appointed to run the baths in 1799, and they were subsequently known as Howarth's Baths. A steam engine was installed for pumping and heating water for the baths and the hospital. During 1808 4,654 baths were taken by the public – not counting those taken by anyone belonging to the infirmary. In 1813 the waterworks company agreed to supply water to the baths and hospital free of charge. In 1836 the bathman was paid £160, and an additional allowance for washing towels. The average annual profit was £95. In 1845 it was decided to close the baths.

18th-century development 
A scheme for inoculating poor people for smallpox was started in 1784. They were attended, when necessary, in their own homes, as were people with contagious diseases. Jenner's scheme of vaccination was enthusiastically adopted in 1800, and 1,000 people were vaccinated in six months. In 1790 two physicians were appointed to deal with home visits. A new building for out patients and the dispensary was completed and the hospital was officially titled "The Infirmary, Dispensary, Lunatic Hospital and Asylum in Manchester". There were now six physicians and six surgeons. A library was established in the Infirmary in 1791. Dr John Ferriar, one of the physicians, helped to set up a Board of Health which rented 4 houses in Portland Street belonging to the Lunatic Asylum for use as a fever hospital. It was called the House of Recovery and patients from the rest of the infirmary were moved there if they had infectious diseases.

In 1793 a new north wing was built, with room for 50 more beds. In 1824 the Board noted that it had become impossible to admit all the patients in need of care. Erysipelas had become a problem on surgical wards as a result of overcrowding. £5,600 was raised to fund further extensions, which were opened in 1828. The extension included nurses kitchens, 8 water closets, a wash house and laundry, and an accident room and surgery. There were now "upwards of 180 beds", but the surgical wards were still overcrowded and patients were forced to share beds.

19th century 

The infirmary was renamed the Manchester Royal Infirmary Dispensary, Lunatic Hospital and Asylum in 1830. Jenny Lind gave two concerts for the benefit of the funds in December 1848 allowing the construction of new wings to proceed.

Arrangements with Devonshire Royal Hospital and Southport Promenade Hospital for convalescent care were established. In 1867 Cheadle Hall was first rented and then purchased and equipped for the care of 30 convalescent patients. It was renamed the Barnes Convalescent Home in recognition of a donation of £10,000 by Robert Barnes.

Monsall Hospital was established in North Manchester in 1871 as a fever hospital. Robert Barnes donated £9,000 and the hospital was named the Barnes House of Recovery. Manchester City Council contributed £500. The total cost was £13,000. There was accommodation for 128 fever patients and room to separate patients with different infections.

Telephones were first installed in 1880, free of charge by courtesy of the Lancashire and Cheshire Telephone Company, a clinical laboratory erected in the grounds in 1898, and x-rays began in 1904. The x-ray machine was housed in the chapel as no other space could be found.

In 1832 two new porticos, each with four Ionic columns, had been completed. By the late 19th century statues had been installed on the esplanade on the northern side while the streets to the south beyond Parker Street were narrow.

Organised admission of medical pupils began in 1793. The fee for the first six-month session was 5 guineas, and for two subsequent sessions 3 guineas with extra fees payable to surgeons for attendance at operations. in 1817 fees for apprentices were 200 guineas, paid after completion of a three-month probation period. Apprenticeship lasted at least 5 years and the fee covered board and lodging. They were increased to 260 guineas in 1824 Students in the 19th century were awarded external degrees by the University of London. A catalogue of the library was compiled by Frank Renaud and published in 1859.

Oxford Road

Opening of the new hospital 

Discussions about moving the infirmary to its present site in Oxford Road started in 1875, and a plan was finally agreed in 1904. The Picadilly site was sold to the City Council for £400,000 and plans for new buildings designed by Edwin Hall and John Brooke were accepted after a competition. It was officially opened by King Edward VII on 6 July 1909.

A radiology department was not envisaged in the plans, but Dr Barclay, appointed in 1909, established a department in the basement. In 1913 more than 5,000 patients were examined radiologically. Radiotherapy for cancer patients started in 1914 and Manchester and District Radium Institute was established in a building next to the hospital in 1921. In 1930 a new nurses' home, Sparshott House, was built. It was not until 1933 that the official title of the hospital was changed to the Manchester Royal Infirmary.

Second World War 
On 28 August 1939 400 patients were evacuated and 440 beds prepared for expected casualties. By November 1939, in the absence of the expected casualties all the beds were brought back into use. A large emergency blood transfusion centre was established and continued after the war.

A high explosive bomb penetrated the new nurses' home, Sparshott House, on 11 October 1940. 112 nurses were in the basement shelters, but nobody was hurt. However none of the rooms could be used and the nurses had to sleep elsewhere, including in the university. Within a month 130 bedrooms were back in use. The biggest raids on Manchester were on 22 and 23 December 1940. On the first night very few actually struck the hospital buildings but most of the windows were blown out. 10,000 panes of glass had to be replaced. On the first night 186 casualties were admitted and 400 more treated in the casualty and first aid posts. On the second night a time bomb fell on the X-ray and teaching block which exploded on the following day, 24 December, leading to significant disruption.

Post-war 
In 1950 a new neurology and neurosurgery unit was built, with its own operating block.

Throughout the early 1970s the department of radiology was a pioneer of CT scanning under consultant neuroradiologist Dr Ian Isherwood. In 1972, the MRI became the first hospital in the world to obtain a commercially available CT scanner, the EMI CT1000, following the development of the prototype at Atkinson Morley Hospital in London the year before. In 1975 the department received the first whole-body CT scanner in Europe, the EMI CT5000.

Services

The Infirmary itself specialises in cardiology, in renal medicine and surgery and in kidney and pancreas transplants. Its A&E department deals with around 145,000 patients every year. The transplant team carried out 317 transplants in 2015, the most of any centre in the UK.

See also
 Healthcare in Greater Manchester
 List of hospitals in England

References

Further reading

Valier, Helen K. (2007) "The Manchester Royal Infirmary, 1945-97: a microcosm of the National Health Service", in: Bulletin of the John Rylands University Library of Manchester; vol. 87, no. 1 (2005)

External links 

 
 Care Quality Commission inspection reports

Manchester University NHS Foundation Trust
Buildings and structures completed in 1755
Hospital buildings completed in the 18th century
NHS hospitals in England
Hospitals in Manchester
Teaching hospitals in England
1752 establishments in England
Hospitals established in the 1750s
Voluntary hospitals
Physicians of the Manchester Royal Infirmary